The Morane-Saulnier I, also known as the Morane-Saulnier Type I was a French fighter of the 1910s. Essentially a modified Morane-Saulnier N, the Royal Flying Corps possessed a number of them in World War I.

Development
Largely on the advice of Lord Trenchard, the Royal Flying Corps placed an order in 1916 for a more powerful version of the popular Morane-Saulnier N. Morane-Saulnier responded by fitting a 110 hp Le Rhône engine to a Type N, creating what they called the Type I. An order was placed initially for one aircraft, expanding to thirteen by March 1916.

Operational history
However, only four aircraft were ever delivered to the RFC by July 1916, the aircraft having first flown in March of that year under RFC trials. No further production took place because the Morane-Saulnier V afforded more favourable characteristics. However, these Type Is were delivered to the front as combat aircraft and used as late as October 1916.

Variants
Morane-Saulnier I company designation
MS.6 official French government STAe designation for the I

Operators
 
 Royal Flying Corps

Specifications

References

Citations

Bibliography
 
Bruce, Jack. "The Bullets and the Guns". Air Enthusiast. Nine, February–May 1979. pp. 61–75.

Further reading

1910s French fighter aircraft
I
Rotary-engined aircraft
Shoulder-wing aircraft
Single-engined tractor aircraft
Aircraft first flown in 1916